Bunea may refer to:

Persons
 Gheorghe Bunea Stancu (born 1954), Romanian politician
 Catalin Florentin Bunea (born 1981), Romanian / Canadian Banker
 Florentina Bunea (born 1966), Romanian statistician

Places
 Bunea Mare, a village in the commune Făget, Timiș County, Romania
 Bunea Mică, a village in the commune Făget, Timiș County, Romania
 Bunea (river), a tributary of the river Bega in Timiș County, Romania

Romanian-language surnames